Acrylamide (or acrylic amide) is an organic compound with the chemical formula CH2=CHC(O)NH2. It is a white odorless solid, soluble in water and several organic solvents. From the chemistry perspective, acrylamide is a vinyl-substituted primary amide (CONH2). It is produced industrially mainly as a precursor to polyacrylamides, which find many uses as water-soluble thickeners and flocculation agents.

Acrylamide forms in burnt areas of food, particularly starchy foods like potatoes, when cooked with high heat, above . Despite health scares following its discovery in 2002, dietary acrylamide is thought unlikely to be carcinogenic for humans; Cancer Research UK categorized the idea that burnt food causes cancer as a "myth".

Production
Acrylamide can be prepared by the hydration of acrylonitrile:
CH2=CHCN  +  H2O  →  CH2=CHC(O)NH2

This reaction is catalyzed by sulfuric acid, various metal salts, and the enzyme nitrile hydratase. In 2008, an estimated 750,000,000 kg of polyacrylamide were produced, mainly using the enzymatic route.

Uses

The majority of acrylamide is used to manufacture various polymers, especially polyacrylamide.  This water-soluble polymer, which has very low toxicity, is widely used as thickener and flocculating agent.  These functions are valuable in the purification of drinking water, corrosion inhibition, mineral extraction, and paper making.  Polyacrylamide gels are routinely used in medicine and biochemistry for purification and assays.

Toxicity and carcinogenicity

Acrylamide can arise in some cooked foods via a series of steps by the reaction of the amino acid asparagine and glucose. This condensation, one of the Maillard reactions, followed by dehydrogenation produces N-(D-glucos-1-yl)-L-asparagine, which upon pyrolysis generates some acrylamide.

The discovery in 2002 that some cooked foods contain acrylamide attracted significant attention to its possible biological effects. IARC, NTP, and the EPA have classified it as a probable carcinogen. Although epidemiological studies (as of 2019) suggest that dietary acrylamide consumption does not significantly increase people's risk of developing cancer.

Europe
According to the EFSA, the main toxicity risks of acrylamide are "Neurotoxicity, adverse effects on male reproduction, developmental toxicity and carcinogenicity". However, according to their research, there is no concern on non-neoplastic effects. Furthermore, while the relation between consumption of acrylamide and cancer in rats and mice has been shown, it is still unclear whether acrylamide consumption has an effect on the risk of developing cancer in humans, and existing epidemiological studies in humans are very limited and do not show any relation between acrylamide and cancer in humans. Food industry workers exposed to twice the average level of acrylamide do not exhibit higher cancer rates.

HEATOX (heat-generated food toxicants) study in Europe
The Heat-generated Food Toxicants (HEATOX) Project was a European Commission-funded multidisciplinary research project running from late 2003 to early 2007. Its objectives were to "estimate health risks that may be associated with hazardous compounds in heat-treated food, [and to] find cooking/processing methods that minimize the amounts of these compounds, thereby providing safe, nutritious, and high-quality food-stuffs." It found that "the evidence of acrylamide posing a cancer risk for humans has been strengthened," and that "compared with many regulated food carcinogens, the exposure to acrylamide poses a higher estimated risk to European consumers." HEATOX sought also to provide consumers with advice on how to lower their intake of acrylamide, specifically pointing out that home-cooked food tends to contribute far less to overall acrylamide levels than food that was industrially prepared, and that avoiding overcooking is one of the best ways to minimize exposure at home.

United States
Acrylamide is classified as an extremely hazardous substance in the United States as defined in Section 302 of the U.S. Emergency Planning and Community Right-to-Know Act (42 U.S.C. 11002), and is subject to strict reporting requirements by facilities which produce, store, or use it in significant quantities.

Acrylamide is considered a potential occupational carcinogen by U.S. government agencies and classified as a Group 2A carcinogen by the IARC. The Occupational Safety and Health Administration and the National Institute for Occupational Safety and Health have set dermal occupational exposure limits at 0.03 mg/m3 over an eight-hour workday.

Opinions of health organizations

Baking, grilling or broiling food causes significant concentrations of acrylamide. This discovery in 2002 led to international health concerns. Subsequent research has however found that it is not likely that the acrylamides in burnt or well-cooked food cause cancer in humans; Cancer Research UK categorizes the idea that burnt food causes cancer as a "myth".

The American Cancer Society says that laboratory studies have shown that acrylamide is likely to be a carcinogen, but that  evidence from epidemiological studies suggests that dietary acrylamide is unlikely to raise the risk of people developing most common types of cancer.

Hazards
Acrylamide is also a skin irritant and may be a tumor initiator in the skin, potentially increasing risk for skin cancer. Symptoms of acrylamide exposure include dermatitis in the exposed area, and peripheral neuropathy.

Laboratory research has found that some phytochemicals may have the potential to be developed into drugs which could alleviate the toxicity of acrylamide.

Mechanism of action

Acrylamide is metabolized to the genotoxic derivative glycidamide. On the other hand, acrylamide and glycidamide can be detoxified via conjugation with glutathione.

Occurrence in food

Production of acrylamide in the heating process was shown to be temperature-dependent. It was not found in food that had been boiled, or in foods that were not heated.

Acrylamide has been found in roasted barley tea, called mugicha in Japanese. The barley is roasted so it is dark brown prior to being steeped in hot water. The roasting process produced 200–600 micrograms/kg of acrylamide in mugicha. This is less than the >1000 micrograms/kg found in potato crisps and other fried whole potato snack foods cited in the same study and it is unclear how much of this is ingested after the drink is prepared. Rice cracker and sweet potato levels were lower than in potatoes. Potatoes cooked whole were found to have significantly lower acrylamide levels than the others, suggesting a link between food preparation method and acrylamide levels.

Acrylamide levels appear to rise as food is heated for longer periods of time. Although researchers are still unsure of the precise mechanisms by which acrylamide forms in foods, many believe it is a byproduct of the Maillard reaction. In fried or baked goods, acrylamide may be produced by the reaction between asparagine and reducing sugars (fructose, glucose, etc.) or reactive carbonyls at temperatures above .

Later studies have found acrylamide in black olives, dried plums, dried pears, coffee, and peanuts.

The US FDA has analyzed a variety of U.S. food products for levels of acrylamide since 2002.

Occurrence in cigarettes
Cigarette smoking is a major acrylamide source. It has been shown in one study to cause an increase in blood acrylamide levels three-fold greater than any dietary factor.

See also
Acrydite: research on this compound casts light on acrylamide
Acrolein
Alkyl nitrites
Deep-frying
Deep fryer
Vacuum fryer
Substance of very high concern
Heterocyclic amines
Polycyclic aromatic hydrocarbons

References

Further reading

External links 

 
Carboxamides
Hazardous air pollutants
IARC Group 2A carcinogens
Monomers
Reproductive toxicants
Suspected fetotoxicants